Hogmanay Pass is a pass  high, immediately southwest of the Scripps Heights, leading from the head of Casey Glacier to the middle of Lurabee Glacier, in northeastern Palmer Land, Antarctica. The feature was first photographed from the air by Lincoln Ellsworth in November 1935, and its southern portion was plotted from these photos by W.L.G. Joerg. It was rephotographed by the United States Antarctic Service in 1940, and by the Ronne Antarctic Research Expedition in 1947. This pass was used by a Falkland Islands Dependencies Survey survey party in December 1960 and provided a good sledge route. It was so named because the pass was approached on the last day of 1960, the Scottish feast of Hogmanay.

References

Mountain passes of Palmer Land